Meendum Oru Kaathal Kathai is a 1985 Indian Tamil-language romance film directed by Pratap Pothen in his directorial debut, and produced by Raadhika. They also star as the lead characters. The script was co-written by Pratap along with Somasundareshwar. The film revolves around the relationship between two mentally challenged people.

The soundtrack was composed by Ilaiyaraaja. The cinematography and editing were handled by P. C. Sreeram and B. Lenin respectively. At the 32nd National Film Awards, the film won the Indira Gandhi Award for Best Debut Film of a Director. It was theatrically released on 15 February 1985.

Plot 
Sarasu, born to a rich eccentric businessman Badrinath, is a mentally challenged child. Unable to cope with her condition, Badrinath admits her in a home for such children and is taken care by a Christian Missionary Principal and a guardian Juju Thatha, a kind old man. Sarasu meets Ganapathi "Guppi", another intellectually challenged orphan and they strike a rare affection for each other and become inseparable.

Year pass by Badrinath and his wife come to take Sarasu for their son's wedding engagement. Sarasu innocently insists that Guppi should also accompany her and Guppi is reluctantly accommodated at the insistence of the Principal.

At the wedding party, Guppi and Sarasu bump into the engaged couple and notice their clandestine affair. Sarasu insists her parents to get her married with Guppi. In a weird twist of things the idea appeals to the guests and Badrinath agrees and Sarasu and Guppi's marriage takes place.

Guppi and Sarasu are sent to Korakunda, a mountain village along with Juju Thathta as their guardian. Korakunda is an unusual village inhabited by strange people; Manohar, the photographer with a vintage tumbled-down box camera who specializes in taking the photos of the dead for the bereaved. Nylux Nalini, a footloose women who has illicit affairs, Kitney, a person who files kites, the village headman and a few others.

Guppi and Sarasu get into a physical relationship and Sarasu becomes pregnant. One day in the woods, the drunken village headman tries to molest Sarasu and Guppi, who sees it throws a boulder on his head and kills him. Guppi is condemned to life in prison. Sarasu, separated from Guppi is in distressed agony. She is admitted for delivery in a hospital and Guppi, on special permission visits her. In their own innocent way they try to relive their past happier moments. She dies delivering a baby.

Guppi, unable to understand death, tries to revive her and when he fails and finds her motionless, snatches the newly born child and flashes the sharp edge of the blood-bottle menacingly at others. But he is quickly overwhelmed and taken back to the prison. Guppi never talked or laughed after the death of his Sarasu and dies after few years in prison.

Cast 
 Pratap Pothen as Ganapathi "Guppi"
 Raadhika as Sarasu
 Charuhasan as the Christian Missionary Principal
 Y. G. Mahendran as Manohar
 Kannan as Sarasu's brother
 Dakshinamurthy as Badrinath
 Ronnie Patel as Juju

Production 

Meendum Oru Kaathal Kathai marked the directorial debut of Pratap Pothen. He said that he "could find no lead actor for it, so I did it myself." Pratap portrayed negative roles in Telugu films in order to raise funds for the film. The script was co-written by Somasundareshwar. He recalled that during the sets of Panneer Pushpangal (1981), Pratap promised him that he would direct a film based on his script. The cinematography was handled by P. C. Sreeram. The film was shot over the period of a year. During the film's production, Pratap and Raadhika fell in love and got married; however they got divorced in 1986.

Soundtrack 
The soundtrack was composed by Ilaiyaraaja and the lyrics were written by Gangai Amaran.

Reception 
At the 32nd National Film Awards, the film won the Indira Gandhi Award for Best Debut Film of a Director.

References

Bibliography

External links 
 

1980s romance films
1980s Tamil-language films
1985 directorial debut films
1985 films
Best Debut Feature Film of a Director National Film Award winners
Films directed by Pratap Pothen
Films scored by Ilaiyaraaja
Films set in psychiatric hospitals
Films with screenplays by K. Rajeshwar
Indian romance films